Eilema gashorai is a moth of the subfamily Arctiinae. It was described by Hervé de Toulgoët in 1980. It is found in Rwanda.

References

gashorai
Moths described in 1980